Health Education Systems Incorporated (HESI) is a United States company that provides exams and other study material to help prepare student nurses for their professional licensure exam. Schools often use HESI to help predict the student's likelihood of success in tests such as the NCLEX-RN. Their Admission Assessment (A2) Exam are used as a baseline entrance criterion by some nursing schools. This exam is computerized and administered online in a four-hour setting.

HESI was acquired by Elsevier in 2006.

Exam content
The exam is 315 minutes (5 hours and 15 minutes) and consists of 310 questions. There are up to 8 topics covered in separate subtests: Reading, Vocabulary & General Knowledge, Grammar, Basic Math Skills, Biology, Chemistry, Anatomy & Physiology and Physics. Different programs may require different combinations of these subjects.

Exit Exam (E)
Many schools use the E exam to assess students preparedness for the NCLEX exam. E results also have a role in assessing the effectiveness of the school's curriculum and faculty.

See also
 Nursing education
 Professional licensure in the United States
 Test of Essential Academic Skills

External links

References

Nursing education
Nursing in the United States
Nursing regulation
Professional examinations in healthcare
Standardized tests in the United States